Aspergillus arxii (also referred to as Cristaspora arxii) is a species of fungus in the genus Aspergillus. It is from the Cremei section. The species was first described in 1984.

Growth and morphology

A. arxii has been cultivated on both Czapek yeast extract agar (CYA) plates and Malt Extract Agar Oxoid® (MEAOX) plates. The growth morphology of the colonies can be seen in the pictures below.

References 

arxii
Fungi described in 1984